The UNIFFAC Clubs Cup is an international club association football competition run by the Central African Football Federations' Union known by its French acronym UNIFFAC, for clubs from Central African countries of Cameroon, Chad, Congo, DR Congo, Equatorial Guinea and Gabon.

Winners

External links
RSSSF

International club association football competitions in Africa